Néstor Osorio Londoño (born 7 August 1947) is a Colombian diplomat. Former Ambassador to the United Kingdom of Great Britain and Northern Ireland and former Permanent Representative to the United Nations. He has been President of both the United Nations Security Council and the United Nations Economic and Social Council.

After a career as an administrative lawyer, he served as the first Permanent Representative of Colombia to the World Trade Organization (WTO) in Geneva from 1995 to 1999. He was Executive Director of the International Coffee Organization from 2002 to 2010, where he had represented Colombia since 1978 when he was named Alternate Delegate and later becoming head of mission and Permanent Representative until 1994. After leaving the WTO, he worked for the Colombian Government as High Advisor for Coffee Policy from September 2000 until his election as Executive Director of the ICO.

In November 2010, Osorio became Colombia's Permanent Representative to the United Nations in New York. In March 2011, during the discussion regarding the situation, he strongly advocated for foreign military intervention, which resulted in ousting of President Gaddafi, engulfed the country in a civil war and destabilized the Sahel region of Africa.  During April 2011, Colombia held the rotating presidency of the UN Security Council, and Osorio was the Council's president. In 2013 he was president of the United Nations Economic and Social Council. In 2014 he became ambassador to the United Kingdom of Great Britain and Northern Ireland.

References

Living people
People from Bogotá
Del Rosario University alumni
University of Paris alumni
20th-century Colombian lawyers
Permanent Representatives of Colombia to the United Nations
Ambassadors of Colombia to the United Kingdom
Paris 2 Panthéon-Assas University alumni
1974 births